Seklusyon is a 2016 Filipino supernatural horror thriller film directed by Erik Matti. The film is under the production of Reality Entertainment. It stars Rhed Bustamante, Neil Ryan Sese, Ronnie Alonte, Lou Veloso, Phoebe Walker, Dominic Roque, Elora Españo, John Vic De Guzman, JR Versales, Jerry O'Hara, Sherry Lara and Teroy Guzman. It is an official entry to the 2016 Metro Manila Film Festival, where it won 9 categories, including "Best Director" award for Erik Matti.

The film is Erik Matti's third MMFF entry in recent years after his 2014 film Kubot: The Aswang Chronicles 2, and 2015 film Honor Thy Father which was the subject of controversy that year when it was disqualified from the "Best Picture" category of the festival's award.

Plot
In 1947, Padre Ricardo (Neil Ryan Sese) arrives at a marketplace to investigate people whose ailments were miraculously healed by a child named Anghela Sta. Ana (Rhed Bustamante), who is assisted by a mysterious nun, Sister Cecilia (Phoebe Walker). Ricardo becomes suspicious of Anghela's powers; every time she heals someone, black liquid drips from her mouth.

Miguel (Ronnie Alonte), a deacon, arrives at a monastery and meets Sandoval (Lou Veloso), a former priest who has been excommunicated by the bishop. Sandoval tells him about the old ritual where deacons or aspiring priests are sent in a secluded area on the last seven days of their training, the purpose of which is to shield them from evil, for it is believed that the last seven days is when they are most vulnerable to the influence of the devil. While in seclusion, Miguel meets fellow deacons, Carlo, Fabián, and Marco.

While in a church, Padre Ricardo discovers a bloodied Anghela, her parents having been murdered. The bishop orders that Anghela and Cecilia be moved together to a secluded place - the same monastery where the deacons are undergoing their training - despite Ricardo's protests about his suspicions of Cecilia. However, the bishop allows Ricardo to continue his investigation.

Sandoval at first refuses to let Anghela and Sister Cecilia stay, as they will disrupt the deacons' training, but later begrudgingly agrees because he is told that their stay is under the order of the bishop. Anghela uses her powers to make their bread, which had gone moldy and spoiled, edible again, as well as turning the tap water into wine. The deacons - except Miguel - are impressed with her powers, seeing it as miraculous.

During the course of their stay, the deacons are plagued by recurring nightmares in the form of their sins: Marco's gluttonous nature was the cause of his siblings' death from starvation during the war; Fabián's entry into the priesthood is a way to leave his physically abusive mother; and Miguel is taunted by his dead ex-lover, Erina, in the form of the Virgin Mary.

One night, Anghela goes into the kitchen to ask Sandoval for food and water, and later on talks to him about his excommunication. As Anghela convinces him that he was not at fault for his sins, Sandoval leaves the next morning, thanking the girl and handing the deacons under her charge.

In the course of his investigation, Padre Ricardo arrives at a convent to question the Mother Superior about Sister Cecilia. Despite her rudeness, the Mother Superior willingly gives him Cecilia's records, but warns him to stop investigating and to never return. The records state that Cecilia was raped by several men during the war and that part of her face was burned. She later became Anghela's teacher; it is implied that Anghela healed her wounds. He also discovers that Anghela was raised in an orphanage and was adopted. To Ricardo's surprise, one of the documents appeared to have the name "NgaHela" written on it, a rearrangement of Anghela's name which is said to be the name of the devil incarnate. The document explains that Anghela's healing and miraculous powers come not from God, but from the devil. With evidence of Anghela as a false prophet and Cecilia being one of her minions, Ricardo visits the bishop to warn him of Anghela's true nature, but at the same moment Sandoval bursts in the room and shoots the bishop dead. He informs the shocked Ricardo about Anghela's whereabouts and that she is waiting for him.

On their last few days of training, Anghela convinces the four deacons to redeem themselves from their sins by feeding their vices, sometimes using Sister Cecilia as a pawn for her schemes. The first to succumb was Marco, who gave in to his gluttonous nature. Next was Fabián, who is revealed to be abusive towards women due to the abuse he received from his mother. Carlo is revealed to be a pedophile and was the next to succumb to Anghela's power.

During a mass held by Anghela in the chapel, Miguel unsuccessfully tries to convince the other deacons that she is not to be trusted. He angrily calls Anghela a false prophet and runs into the woods, where he is followed by Anghela, Cecilia, and the three deacons. During the chase, Miguel trips and is knocked unconscious. The next scene shows a flashback of Miguel's relationship with Erina. It is revealed that Miguel left Erina with their unborn child to undergo the priesthood. Feeling betrayed and heartbroken by his decision to leave her, Erina hangs and kills herself after giving birth to their child. During this time, Anghela sees Miguel and heals his head wound. As Miguel wakes up, he realizes that Anghela is his daughter. Back at the chapel, Anghela continues her ritual and has the four deacons drink from a cup filled with black liquid. Miguel drinks from the cup, but is still doubtful.

Padre Ricardo finally confronts Anghela, and tries to exorcise her, only to be burned to death by her supernatural powers. Miguel witnesses what happened, seizes Anghela, takes her to the chapel, and barricades the door. There Anghela reveals herself as NgaHela, a demon whose malevolent plot is to take over the church; those whom she heals end up worshipping her.

As Sister Cecilia and the three deacons try to break down the barricade, Miguel grabs a knife and stabs Anghela several times. Black liquid drips out from her mouth as she slowly dies. Miguel then escapes, never to be seen again. The movie ends with Fabián, Carlo, and Marco, ordained by the new bishop into the priesthood, still unaware that they were not blessed by God, but by the devil.

Cast

Ronnie Alonte as Miguel
 Rhed Bustamante as Anghela Sta. Ana/ Anghela
 Neil Ryan Sese as Fr. Ricardo
 Lou Veloso as Sandoval
 Phoebe Walker as Sr. Cecilia
 Dominic Roque as Fabian
 Elora Españo as Erina
 John Vic De Guzman as Marco
 JR Versales as Carlo
 Teroy Guzman as Fr. Francisco
 Jerry O'Hara as Obispo
 Sherry Lara as Mother Superior

Production
The production team of Seklusyon decided not to use any special effects to make the film as realistic as possible. Touch hubs were used but no computer-generated characters were devised for the film.

Reception
Jill Tan Radovan of Interaksyon.com writes, "Seklusyon succeeds at being the ‘real horror movie’ that its creators—Reality Entertainment and Eric Matti —intended it to be [...] Taken literally, it sends goosebumps up one’s spine." Mari-an Santos for Philippine Entertainment Portal writes, "The undeniable Erik Matti ending makes [Seklusyon] worth the time, making audiences think and see the world outside with a new set of eyes." Clarence Tsui for The Hollywood Reporter writes, "Seclusion drips with a ferocity about how false messiahs manipulate meek minds who, as the film's finale suggests, then propel even more malicious pretenders onto the pedestals of power. The film is Matti's call for an awakening, and it certainly stirs with spine-tingling moments aplenty."

Oggs Cruz of Rappler gave a balanced review. While praising the film as being "immensely intriguing" and "curiously elegant", he feels that the  screenplay is awkwardly paced and Ronnie Alonte's performance wanting.

See also
 List of ghost films

Accolades

References

External links

2016 films
Films set in 1947
Philippine horror films
Philippine thriller films
Religious horror films
Gothic horror films
Reality Entertainment films
Fictional depictions of the Antichrist
Demons in film
The Devil in film
Films directed by Erik Matti